In wired computer networking, including the Internet, a hop occurs when a packet is passed from one network segment to the next. Data packets pass through routers as they travel between source and destination. The hop count refers to the number of network devices through which data passes from source to destination (depending on routing protocol, this may include the source/destination, that is, the first hop is counted as hop 0 or hop 1).

Since store and forward and other latencies are incurred through each hop, a large number of hops between source and destination implies lower real-time performance.

Hop count 
In wired networks, the hop count refers to the number of networks or network devices through which data passes between source and destination (depending on routing protocol, this may include the source/destination, that is, the first hop is counted as hop 0 or hop 1). Thus, hop count is a rough measure of distance between two hosts. For a routing protocol using 1-origin hop counts (such as RIP), a hop count of n means that n networks separate the source host from the destination host. Other protocols such as DHCP use the term "hop" to refer to the number of times a message has been forwarded.

On a layer 3 network such as Internet Protocol (IP), each router along the data path constitutes a hop. By itself, this metric is, however, not useful for determining the optimum network path, as it does not take into consideration the speed, load, reliability, or latency of any particular hop, but merely the total count. Nevertheless, some routing protocols, such as Routing Information Protocol (RIP), use hop count as their sole metric.

Each time a router receives a packet, it modifies the packet, decrementing the time to live (TTL). The router discards any packets received with a zero TTL value. This prevents packets from endlessly bouncing around the network in the event of routing errors. Routers are capable of managing hop counts, but other types of network devices (e.g. Ethernet hubs and bridges) are not.

Hop limit 
Known as time to live (TTL) in IPv4, and hop limit in IPv6, this field specifies a limit on the number of hops a packet is allowed before being discarded. Routers modify IP packets as they are forwarded, decrementing the respective TTL or hop limit fields. Routers do not forward packets with a resultant field of 0 or less. This prevents packets from following a loop forever.

Next hop 
When configuring network devices the hop may refer to next hop. Next hop is the next gateway to which packets should be forwarded along the path to their final destination. A routing table usually contains the IP address of a destination network and the IP address of the next gateway along the path to the final network destination. By only storing next-hop information, next-hop routing or next-hop forwarding reduces the size of routing tables. A given gateway only knows one step along the path, not the complete path to a destination. It is also key to know that the next hops listed in a routing table are on networks to which the gateway is directly connected .

Diagnostics
The traceroute command can be used to measure the number of router hops from one host to another. Hop counts are often useful to find faults in a network or to discover if routing is indeed correct.

Wireless ad hoc networking

In a wireless ad hoc network, commonly, every participating node is also acting as a router. This means that the terms "hop" and "hop count" are often the subject of confusion. Often, the sending node is simply counted as the first hop, thus yielding the same number for "hops" for both interpretations of "hop" as "traversed routers" and "jumps from node to node". For example, RFC 6130 defines a "1-hop neighbor" as any other node that is directly reachable via the wireless interface.

See also
Internet Control Message Protocol
Ping (networking utility)

References 

Computer networking
Routing

de:Hop (Netzwerktechnologie)